Stokesia  may refer to:
 Stokesia (plant), a plant genus in the family Asteraceae
 Stokesia (ciliate), a single-celled ciliate protozoa genus in the family Stokesiidae